Sett (pronounced "Sheth") is a Bengali surname, derived from "Shreshthi" (which means businessman in Hindi).
Shreshthis were the oldest known businessmen in northern India. The name was changed to "Shethi" during the medieval period. After the arrival of the East India Company in India, the surname was anglicised to "Sheth" and later to "Sett". 

The Setts originally came from Gujarat during the 15th century and settled in Saptagram, Bengal and were engaged in primarily trading in cotton. In those days, Saptagram was a prosperous trading port in the East Indies and it was the Portuguese who were the predominant European merchants there. They used to call it "Porto Pequeno" or Little Haven and predated the British by more than 100 years. The Setts prospered and gradually started to blend into the Bengali culture. Gradual silting caused Saptagram to lose its importance and the Setts moved their business further down to Betor, which was in Howrah, diagonally opposite Calcutta across the Ganges. While in Betor, they set up their residences in Gobindapur (present day Dalhousie Square in Calcutta). Those days, Gobindapur was a dense marshy jungle inhabited by wild animals. The Setts cleared the area and build their mansions over here. With the advent of the British, Dutch and other European traders, Betor was poised to be a major trading centre and the Setts became the dominating Indian merchants of the region. Job Charnock arrived from Patna towards the end of the 17th century and established a trading post.

When the British decided to build a fort in Calcutta to protect their mercantile interest, they asked the inhabitants of Gobindapur to move further north into Sutanuti. The Setts moved to Banstolla, present day Hariram Goenka Street, Burrabazar and resettled their family deity, 'Gobinda Jew" and built their dwellings around that. The Sett family temple and mansions are still there and stands testimony to the wealth and prosperity of the Setts.

From different sources one gets the general idea that a major part of Dalhousie Square belonged to the Setts. Calcutta is because of their endeavours and they are the lost founders of the city that went on to become the capital of British India and made its place in history.

See also
Sethi
Sheth
Chettiar

Bengali Hindu surnames